Tarahi is a  high andesite volcano, in the Kaikohe-Bay of Islands volcanic field in New Zealand. Northwest of Tarahi is a smaller,  basaltic scoria cone, Haruru pā, before the higher cone of Te Ahuahu. To its immediate east is Putahi and the location of a famous battle of the Flagstaff War adjacent to Lake Ōmāpere.

References

Geological Society of New Zealand

Volcanoes of the Northland Region
Far North District